William Beckford (baptised 19 December 1709 – 21 June 1770) was a well-known political figure in 18th-century London, who twice held the office of Lord Mayor of London (1762 and 1769). His vast wealth came largely from his plantations in Jamaica and the large numbers of enslaved Africans working for him and his family. He was, and is, often referred to as Alderman Beckford to distinguish him from his son William Thomas Beckford, author and art collector, and from his nephew William Beckford of Somerley (1744–1799), author and planter. He was a supporter of liberty at home and championed the citizens of London upon being summoned to King George III with the City Remonstrance in 1770.

Early life 
In 1709, William was born in the colony of Jamaica, the son of Peter Beckford, Speaker of the House of Assembly there, and the grandson of Colonel Peter Beckford, sometime Governor of the colony. He was sent to England by his family in 1723 to be educated. He studied at Westminster School, and made his career in the City of London.

Between 1736 and 1744, William Beckford travelled back and forth between Jamaica and England, serving in the Jamaican militia, and as an elected representative of the island's Assembly.

Involvement in slavery 
Beckford's grandfather, Peter Beckford, was Governor of Jamaica, and reputedly owned 20 Jamaican estates, 1,200 slaves and left £1,500,000 in bank stock when he died in 1710. He left the vast majority of this wealth to his son Peter Beckford (junior). When Peter Beckford (junior) died in 1735, the young William Beckford inherited his vast estate, as the sole surviving legitimate son.

William Beckford was one of 13 children, but inherited the sole interest in 13 sugar plantations in Jamaica and owned approximately 3,000 enslaved Africans because his older brother, another Peter Beckford, died in 1712. He also served in the Jamaican National Assembly before returning to England in 1744.

In 1760, slaves rose up in revolt on his estate at Esher, in Saint Mary Parish, Jamaica, and they joined Tacky's War, which embroiled the Colony of Jamaica in a series of rebellions throughout the decade.

Domestic life 
In 1744 Beckford bought an estate at Fonthill Gifford, near Salisbury, Wiltshire.  He made substantial improvements to the property but it was largely destroyed by fire in 1755. "I have an odd fifty thousand pounds in a drawer: I will build it up again," Beckford promptly declared, and rebuilt it as Fonthill Splendens.

On 8 June 1756, aged 47, he married Maria Marsh, daughter of the Hon. George Hamilton. His only child by this marriage was William Thomas Beckford. Beckford also had eight children born out of wedlock who were left legacies in his will.

From 1751 until his death, his London residence was at 22 Soho Square, which became the centre of his political activities.

Political life 

He became an alderman in 1752, a Sheriff of London in 1756 and was then elected Lord Mayor of London first in 1762 and again in 1769. He was returned as Member of Parliament (MP) for the City of London in 1754. As a rich patron, he used his 'interest' in favour of William Pitt the Elder, sponsoring and encouraging his political rise, supporting the Whig cause in general and the West Indies sugar industry (from which his fortune came) in particular.

In September 1758 he wrote to Pitt advising him on the advisability of attacking the French colony of Martinique:
[Martinique] has but one town of strength (...); all the inhabitants (...) have not victuals to support themselves and numerous slaves for one month, without a foreign supply. The Negroes and stock of the island are worth above four million sterling and the conquest easy (...) For God's sake attempt the capture without delay.

Although some laughed at his faulty Latin, his wealth, social position and power obliged people to respect him. He hosted sumptuous feasts, one of which cost £10,000. On one occasion six dukes, two marquises, twenty-three earls, four Viscounts, and fourteen barons from the House of Lords joined members of the House of Commons in a procession to honour him, followed by one of these banquets. He also drew some popular support due to his promotion of political liberalism, in opposition to the party of the 'King's Friends'.

In March 1770 following the release of John Wilkes, of whom Beckford had been an ardent supporter, Beckford decorated his house with a large banner, which according to Horace Walpole bore the word Liberty written in  embroidered white letters. A few weeks later, on 23 May, Beckford publicly admonished George III. Breaking contemporary protocol he asked the King to dissolve Parliament and to remove his civil councillors, referring to "our happy constitution as it was established in the Glorious and Necessary Revolution". King George was reportedly more enraged by the breach of protocol than by the nature of the request, yet it attracted the support of the Common Councilmen of London who expressed their gratitude by erecting a monument in the Guildhall, London including a life-size statue of Beckford (pictured), surmounting a stone tablet on which the words Beckford had used to admonish the king are engraved in gold.

Legacy 
In 1929, the London County Council renamed a school in Broomsleigh Street, West Hampstead as Beckford Primary School. In 2020, as part of the Black Lives Matter movement, the London Borough of Camden announced they would rename the school again. Possible new names included Beryl Gilroy, after the school's first black headteacher. However, as of September 2021, the new name is West Hampstead Primary School.

References

External links 
 

1709 births
1770 deaths
Emigrants from British Jamaica
18th-century lord mayors of London
West Indies merchants
Members of the Parliament of Great Britain for English constituencies
English businesspeople
People educated at Westminster School, London
Sheriffs of the City of London
British MPs 1747–1754
British MPs 1754–1761
British MPs 1761–1768
British MPs 1768–1774
British slave owners
William